Nongtalang is a small town located in West Jaintia Hills district, Meghalaya, India.

Connectivity
Nongtalang is well connected by roadways to Shillong and Jowai. Shillong is 98 km away and Jowai is 42 km away.

Communication services
Fixed telephones lines are not available here. Internet services is available only through wireless broadband. It is only two cellular providers available i.e. Bharti Airtel & Jio 4G.

Institutions in Nongtalang 

Colleges and Institution providing higher studies
Nongtalang College

Prominent schools and higher secondary institutions
Nongtalang Government Secondary School, Nongtalang
St Joseph Secondary School, Nongtalang

Localities in Nongtalang 

Khlachympa
Nongtalang Mission
Banan
Shnongklor
New Nonglamin
Amsohmeheleng

Remusan
Shnongpdeng
Tympang Club
Amlariang
Nongtalang Shnongthmai (New Nongtalang)

Places of interest

References

External links 

Geography of Meghalaya
Hill stations in Meghalaya
West Jaintia Hills district
Cities and towns in West Jaintia Hills district